Paragorgopis cancellata is a species of ulidiid or picture-winged fly in the genus Paragorgopis of the family Ulidiidae.

References

cancellata
Insects described in 1909